Kaleyard Gate is a postern gate in Chester city walls, Cheshire, England.  It is recorded in the National Heritage List for England as a designated Grade I listed building.

In the 13th century the monks of St Werburgh's Abbey had developed a vegetable garden (known as the kaleyard) outside the city walls. They wanted an easier route to access the kaleyard than the longer walk through Eastgate so they petitioned Edward I in 1275 to allow them to cut a gate through the wall to provide direct access to the garden.  This he allowed under certain conditions, one of which was that it must be locked at nightfall.

The gate consists of a simple opening in the sandstone wall containing a door.

See also

Grade I listed buildings in Cheshire West and Chester

References

Kaleyard Gate
Grade I listed buildings in Chester
Medieval architecture
Gates in England
Grade I listed gates